Carmen Lamas (1900 in Spain – 1990 in Buenos Aires) was a Spanish-born tango singer, and the first Spanish actress who made her career in Argentina.  Lamas debuted in 1921 in a cast headed by his father, Miguel Lamas, Spanish actor and director. She was one of the first important figures of the Teatro Maipo, a vedette in the group known at that time as "Primera triple".

Filmography

Movies
 1936: Radio Bar
 1939: Giácomo
 1939: Margarita, Armando y su padre
 1946: Chiruca

Theatre
 ¿Quién dijo miedo?
 Las alegres chicas del Maipo
 Me gustan todas
 Abajo los hombres
 La mejor revista
 Café Concierto 1900
 Gran cabalgata teatral
 Mujeres, Flores y Alegría
 El callejón de la alegría
 A Juan I de Ardula le han encajado la mula 
 Un regalo del destino
 ¡Papá, cómprame un príncipe!
 ¡Qué quiere la Rasimi!
 El callejón de la alegría'''
 Dos Virginias para Pablo ¡Papá, cómprame un príncipe! 
 A Juan 1º de Ardula le han encajado la mula''

References

External links
 

1900 births
1990 deaths
Tango singers
Argentine actresses
20th-century Spanish actresses
20th-century Argentine women singers
Spanish emigrants to Argentina